Federal elections were held in Germany on 6 November 1932. The Nazi Party saw its vote share fall by four percentage points, while there were slight increases for the Communist Party of Germany and the national conservative German National People's Party. The results were a great disappointment for the Nazis, who lost 34 seats and again failed to form a coalition government in the Reichstag. The elections were the last free and fair all-German election before the Nazi seizure of power in 1933.

Background
Previously Chancellor Franz von Papen, a former member of the Catholic Centre Party, had governed without parliamentary support by relying on legislative decrees promulgated by President Paul von Hindenburg under Article 48 of the Weimar Constitution. However, on 12 September 1932 Papen had to ask Hindenburg to dissolve parliament in order to pre-empt a motion of no confidence introduced by the Communist Party, which was expected to pass since the Nazis were also expected to support it due to their desire for fresh elections.

Results

Aftermath
After the election, Papen urged Hindenburg to continue to govern by emergency decree. However, on 3 December, he was replaced by Defence Minister Kurt von Schleicher, who held talks with the left wing of the Nazi Party led by Gregor Strasser in an attempt at a Third Position (Querfront) strategy. The plans failed when Hitler disempowered Strasser and approached Papen for coalition talks. Papen obtained Hindenburg's consent to form the Hitler cabinet on 30 January 1933.

The elections were the last free and fair all-German election before the Nazi seizure of power on 30 January 1933 since the elections in March 1933 saw massive suppression, especially against Communist and Social Democratic Party politicians. The next free national elections were not held until 1949 in West Germany and 1990 in East Germany. The next free all-German elections took place in December 1990, after reunification two months earlier.

References

1932 11
1932 11
Germany
1932 elections in Germany
November 1932 events